Kenneth Pernell Irvin (born July 11, 1972) is a former American football defensive back who played for eleven seasons in the National Football League (NFL) for the Buffalo Bills, New Orleans Saints, and the Minnesota Vikings. He played college football at the University of Memphis, which is where he became affiliated with Phi Beta Sigma fraternity.

References

1972 births
Living people
American football cornerbacks
Buffalo Bills players
New Orleans Saints players
Minnesota Vikings players
Memphis Tigers football players
Sportspeople from Rome, Georgia